Sri Lanka participated at the 2018 Summer Youth Olympics in Buenos Aires, Argentina from 6 October to 18 October 2018.

Sri Lanka made its Youth Olympics (and Olympics) debut in three sports it qualified in: archery, basketball and gymnastics. Sri Lanka also made its Youth Olympics debut in the sport of shooting.

Parami Wasanthi Maristela won Sri Lanka's first ever Youth Olympics medal, a bronze in the girls' 2000 metre steeplechase athletics event.

Competitors
The following is the list of number of competitors participating at the Games per sport/discipline.

Medalists
Medals awarded to participants of mixed-NOC (combined) teams are represented in italics. These medals are not counted towards the individual NOC medal tally.

|width="30%" align=left valign=top|

Archery

Sri Lanka qualified one archer based on its performance at the 2017 World Archery Youth Championships.

Individual

Team

Athletics

Sri Lanka qualified two athletes. On the first day of the Asian trials held in Bangkok, Thailand, Sri Lanka won two quotas. Dilan Bogoda took first place in the boys' 400 metres event, while Parami Wasanthi Maristela won the 2000 metres steeplechase in a world leading team to qualify. On the second day of trials, high jumper Seniru Amarasinghe qualified in second place with the third ranked jump in the world (in the age category), while sprinter Shelinda Jansen qualified in third position.

Track & road events

Total refers to the placement of round 1 added to the placement in round 2 in the women's 2000 m steeplechase event. The second round will be held as part of the cross-country race. 

Field event

Badminton

Sri Lanka qualified a girls' quota after it was reallocated to the country from an unused tripartie commission universality spot. 

Girl

Team

Basketball

Sri Lanka qualified a girls' basketball team of four athletes. This marked the country's debut in the sport at the Youth Olympics.

Girls' tournament

Skills Competition

Gymnastics

Artistic
Sri Lanka qualified one gymnast based on its performance at the 2018 Asian Junior Championship.

Girls
Individual Qualification

Multidiscipline

Shooting

Sri Lanka received a reallocated spot in the boys' 10 m air rifle event.

Boys
Individual

Team

Swimming

Sri Lanka qualified one male swimmer. Akalanka Peiris met the A or B standard times for all of his events.

Boy

See also
Sri Lanka at the 2018 Commonwealth Games
Sri Lanka at the 2018 Asian Games

References

2018 in Sri Lankan sport
Nations at the 2018 Summer Youth Olympics
Sri Lanka at the Youth Olympics